Stevenson, Jordan & Harrison Ltd v MacDonald & Evans [1952] 1 TLR 101 is a UK labour law case, concerning the right of employees to intellectual property in the work they produce.

Facts 
A management engineer wrote a book using information he gained while working for his firm, first as an employee, and then an executive officer. Some was from the text of lectures that he wrote and delivered, and some was material he acquired while on an assignment. He died before publication. The Copyright Act 1911 section 5(1) said that the author of a work is the first owner of a copyright. But if the author was under a contract of employment and the work was in the course of employment the employer would own the copyright in absence of another agreement. His old firm claimed the copyright.

Judgment
Denning LJ held the engineer simply put together his know how of the profession and had not betrayed any mystery of the firm’s business or disclosed trade secrets. His contract was mixed, partly of and partly for services outside the contract. His lecture work was not covered by the Act, but the material acquired while on assignment did fall within the Act. The publishers should be restrained from printing that section, which was severable.

Denning LJ said the following in his judgment.

Mawmen v Teg was distinguished, Waites v Franco-British Exhibition was applied, Cassidy v Ministry of Health was applied and Byrne v Statist Co was applied.

See also

UK labour law

Notes

References

United Kingdom labour case law